Time Out is a brand of wafer-based chocolate bar manufactured by Cadbury Ireland. It was introduced in the United Kingdom and Ireland in 1992, followed by Australia and New Zealand in 1995. Mainly sold in pairs, it consists of a ripple of milk chocolate between two wafers, smothered in Dairy Milk milk chocolate. The bar was originally sold under the slogan "the wafer break with a layer of Flake". Since 2016 it has been re-branded as a single-bar version called Time Out Wafer. The original bar has been rebranded in Australia, and is now titled “Twirl Breakaway”.

History 
In Europe, Time Out was available for the Irish and UK markets and is produced by Cadbury Ireland. It was given a new look in 2010 with lighter blue packaging and was given a new slogan, "Everyone needs some Time Out". However, the new lighter-blue colour proved to be unpopular with customers, and so a few months later its colour reverted to the previously used dark-blue shade.

The bar was also available in Australia, New Zealand, New York City, Japan,  Canada and South Africa.

When Time Out was first introduced, it was a substantial snack (about 25 grams), then it was downsized to 20.2 g. The single-finger bar had shrunk down to 16 g before it was discontinued.

The main twin-finger bar had a combined weight of 32 g (40 g for Australia and New Zealand) and is suitable for vegetarians.

In February 2015, the company announced that production of Time Out would be transferred from Ireland to Poland. Sales of Time Out had been in decline for several years.

In the UK it was replaced with a single-bar version called Time Out Wafer which has more wafer and less chocolate than the original Time Out.

Products
Cadbury Time Out
Cadbury Time Out Chunky
Cadbury Time Out Mint Chunky
Cadbury Time Out Orange
Cadbury Time Out Coffee
Cadbury Time Out Wafer

See also

 List of chocolate bar brands

References 

Chocolate bars
Cadbury brands
Products introduced in 1992
Mondelez International brands